Sir Alexander Oppenheim, OBE FRSE PMN (4 February 1903 – 13 December 1997) was a British mathematician and university administrator. In Diophantine approximation and the theory of quadratic forms, he proposed the Oppenheim conjecture. He was a professor of mathematics at the University of Malaya, the University of Singapore, and its predecessors. During the Second World War, he was a prisoner of war in the Changi Camp and helped organized a "POW University". After the war, he served as the Vice-Chancellor of the University of Malaya before holding two professorships in Ghana and Nigeria.

Early life and education
Oppenheim was born on 4 February 1903 in Salford, England to an immigrant family from Lithuania. His first language was Yiddish. He grew up in Manchester and attended Manchester Grammar School, where he was recognised as a mathematical prodigy. His teachers considered him too young to attend university and delayed his entrance to scholarship competitions until 1921, when he received a scholarship to Balliol College, Oxford. In each of his three undergraduate years at the University of Oxford, Oppenheim was the Oxford University mathematical scholar. He also captained the university chess team. He graduated with first-class honours in 1924 and was the senior mathematical scholar in 1926.

He was awarded a Commonwealth Fellowship to study at Princeton University and the University of Chicago. He completed a PhD at the University of Chicago in 1930 under the supervision L.E. Dickson with a thesis titled Minima of Indefinite Quadratic Quaternary Forms. Oppenheim received a second doctorate, a DSc, from the University of Oxford in 1954 for his academic work later in his career.

Career

Early career
After graduating, Oppenheim spent one year as a lecturer at the University of Edinburgh. He left Edinburgh in 1931 for a professorship at the Raffles College in Singapore.

Prisoner of war
During the Japanese occupation of Singapore, he served in the Singapore Reserve Army with the rank of lance-bombardier. His wife and young daughter escaped Singapore during this time. He was captured by the Japanese in 1942 and was held as a prisoner of war at Changi Camp.

At Changi Camp, Oppenheim helped establish a rudimentary "POW University" with 29 other captured academics and was elected Dean by his fellow prisoners. They had persuaded camp commandant Lieutenant Okazaki to allow them to collect books from Raffles College, hold courses in a dozen classrooms, and organize discussion groups.

Oppenheim's health deteriorated while at Changi Camp and was frequently seriously ill. His involvement at the informal university was interrupted when he was transferred to work on the Siam–Burma Railway.

University administration and later life
From 1945 to 1949, he resumed his position as a Professor in Mathematics at Raffles College. In 1947, he was the deputy principal, acting principal, and Dean of the Faculty of Arts. Oppenheim played a key role in the 1949 merger of Raffles College with King Edward VII College of Medicine to form the University of Malaya. He was appointed acting Vice-Chancellor in 1955 and then Vice-Chancellor in 1957, and remained in that position until his retirement in 1965. During his time as Vice-Chancellor, he oversaw the establishment of the new Kuala Lumpur campus of the university.

After leaving the University of Malaya, Oppenheim served as visiting professor at the University of Reading until 1968. At the invitation of Alexander Kwapong, he taught at the University of Ghana from 1968 to 1973. He then served as the head of the mathematics department at the University of Benin in Nigeria until 1977, when he retired.

He lived in Henley-on-Thames until his death there on 13 December 1997 at the age of 94.

Research
Oppenheim's most important works were in the theory of quadratic forms. In 1929, he proposed the Oppenheim conjecture about representations of numbers by real quadratic forms in several variables.

Personal life
Oppenheim married Beatrice Templer Nesbit (d. 1990) in 1930. They had one daughter and dissolved their marriage in 1977. In 1982, he married Margaret Ng, with whom he had two sons.

Honours
In 1955, Oppenheim became an Officer of the Order of the British Empire. Oppenheim was elected a Fellow of the Royal Society of Edinburgh in 1956. He was knighted in 1961.  In 1962, he was conferred the Malayan title of Dato and became an Honorary Commander of the Order of the Defender of the Realm (Panglima Mangku Negara).

Selected publications

References

Further reading

External links

Biographical Summary
An obituary
Oppenheim Lectures at the National University of Singapore 

1903 births
1997 deaths
20th-century English mathematicians
Number theorists
Alumni of Balliol College, Oxford
University of Chicago alumni
Knights Bachelor
People from Salford
World War II prisoners of war held by Japan
People educated at Manchester Grammar School
Fellows of the Royal Society of Edinburgh
Officers of the Order of the British Empire
Vice-chancellors of universities in Malaysia
Academic staff of the University of Ghana
Academic staff of the University of Benin (Nigeria)
English people of Lithuanian descent
British colonial army soldiers
Scientists from Manchester